Fame Is the Spur is a British television series which first aired on the BBC in 1982. It was based on the 1940 novel Fame Is the Spur by Howard Spring. It depicts a socialist politician who betrays his early beliefs as he grows older, and was believed to be based upon the Labour Prime Minister Ramsay MacDonald. It had previously been adapted as a film Fame Is the Spur by the Boulting Brothers in 1947.

The series starred Tim Pigott-Smith as Hamer Shawcross, prior to his success in The Jewel in the Crown. Joanna David played Shawcross's wife and George Costigan co-starred as Tom Hannaway.

References

External links
 

1980s British drama television series
BBC television dramas
1982 British television series debuts
1982 British television series endings
1980s British television miniseries
Television shows based on British novels
English-language television shows
Television shows set in England